The General Directorate of Industrial Property is a public agency under the supervision of the Ministry of Economic Development, Tourism, Trade and Enterprise. The activity of this institution is regulated by Law 9947 dated. 07/07/2008 "On Industrial Property". This institution grants protections for objects of Industrial Property: Inventions and usage patterns, Industrial design, Commercial and Service Marks, etc.

See also
Copyright law of Albania
Driving licence in Albania

References

Directorate
Industrial Property
Government agencies established in 2008